Dhosi Hill is an important Vedic period site, an extinct volcano, standing alone at the north-west end of the Aravalli mountain range. Its height varies from about 345 to 470 meters from the surrounding lands and 740 meters from the sea level. At present the hill has temples, a pakka pond, ruins of a fort, caves and forest around it. In the ancient times, as per various scriptures like Mahabharata - Vanparv, Puranas, Shathpath Brahmana etc. the hill had Ashrams of various Rishis who made contributions to Vedic scriptures.

The hill has all the physical features of a perfect volcanic hill with distinct crater, lava still lying on it and giving a perfect conical view from top.

It is among the most ancient Vedic religious sites in Haryana located on the route of oldest flow of Saraswati river. It is known for formulation of Chyvanprash for Chayvan Rishi by Rajya Vaids Ashvini Kumar twins for the first time. Chyavana Rishi and his father Bhrugu Rishi had their Ashrams on this hill. Yats

Location 

Dhosi Hill is located on the borders of the Indian states of Haryana and Rajasthan. The Haryana portion lies in Mahendragarh district to the south,  from Narnaul on Singhana Road; the Rajasthan portion lies in Jhunjhunu district to the north.

Importance

As per Manusmriti, this hill is part of the Vedic state of 'Brahmavarta' the land between ancient Saraswati river and Drishadwati rivers which was also called 'Devbhumi'. This being a volcanic hill had erupted on the banks of a river Drishadvati, which had its origin in Aravalli mountains, from Lord Brahma's abode at Pushkar Lake near Ajmer. Even at present times, water from Jaipur district in Rajasthan flows in the ancient river Drishadwati river. According to research by 'Brahmavarta Research foundation',  Rewari, the main Vedic scriptures like Manusmriti, Vedas and Upnishads were evolved and composed in this area called the Manu's state of Brahmavarta, where Rishis and Munis had their Ashrams. Lord Manu, Rishis like Bhrigu, Chyavana, Durvasa, Pippalada etc., who have contributed to various Sanskriti scriptures, had their Ashrams in the vicinity, 50 KMtrs radius of this hill.

Administration 

The hill presently falls under the administration of three village panchayats, being those of Dhosi in Jhunjhunu district of Rajasthan state and of Thana and Kultajpur in Mahendragarh district of Haryana state. These villages are situated on the three waterfalls that become active during the monsoons that occur in July–August, being created from the overflow of a reservoir at the summit. The waterfalls are mentioned in the epic Mahabharata. Each village also has an ancient water reservoir to augment the supply for villagers and animals.

Fort on the Hill

Dhosi Hill has remnants of a fort built by Ganga Singh Nuniwal. Earlier fort built by Raja Nunkaran was destroyed completely in some attacks. 

The fort was constructed to safeguard the heritage and ashrams on the hill from frequent attacks by Muslim invaders during the medieval period. To replace the old temple, a fort modeled on the temple of Chyavana was built at the crater of the hill in the 1890s by the Bhargava community.

All-weather stairs in stone and lime plaster are constructed on the Kultajpur and Thana sides.

Water sources 

A  (reservoir) that stores rainwater for bathing of pilgrims has existed at the summit of the hill for centuries. The stored water is claimed to contain a few rejuvenating properties and treatment for skin ailments. The water in the reservoir becomes herbal and also cupric because of the quantity of copper in the hill and growth of rare herbs in large quantities.

The reservoir becomes silted over time and is desilted at regular intervals. In 1944, the industrialists Birla brothers, led by G. D. Birla, who hailed from the nearby Pilani village, arranged for the reservoir to be desilted and constructed a proper concrete dam on the site to increase the storage capacity. This was done in the memory of their father, Raja Baldev Rai Birla. A plaque is put on the Dam to this effect which states that reservoir could be used for bathing by all shades of Hindu pilgrims, including Sanatani, Harijan, Arya Samaji, Buddhists, Jains and Sikhs. This plaque shows that there was no caste barrier to use of the facilities.

In 2003, the reservoir was desilted by Indian National Trust for Art and Cultural Heritage, an NGO based in Delhi and Haryana.

A well for the supply of water for drinking and other purposes exists on the top of hill which is recharged by seepage and percolation of water from adjoining reservoirs which are charged by the rainwater on the hill. The Government of Haryana now provides drinking water at the hill through mechanical uplifting from the base of the hill.

Parikrama 
Those visiting the hill on pilgrimage perform a parikrama (circumambulation) of it since the time of Mahabharata and Guru Shaunaka of Pandavas. The 8–9 KMs parikrama track includes some portions which are damaged because of landslides.

Temples and religious melas 

Apart from temples at Shiv Kund, halfway to top of hill from Kultajpur side, there are several temples on the crater portion of the hill. Among these is the Chyavana temple, the Shiva temple on the crater, a Devi temple on the hilltop, and a Rama temple next to the Royal Guest House. The Chyavana temple has Shekhawati paintings in the Garbhagrah of the temple and a basement which can be used as a Dharmshala (resting place) for pilgrims. Among other structures on the hill is the renovated Chandrakoop.

Melas are organised at various festivals and other special days. A map from the 1890s indicates there were then separate Ghats for women, known as Janana Ghats, but now they are abandoned.

See also 

 Delhi Ridge
 Leopards of Haryana
 Karoh Peak, Panchkula district, highest point in Haryana, 1467 m peak
 Morni Hills, Panchkula district, 1267 m peak
 Tosham, 240 m average elevation
 Madhogarh, Haryana, 214 m average elevation
 Monuments of National Importance in Haryana
 State Protected Monuments in Haryana
 National Parks & Wildlife Sanctuaries of Haryana
 India cave temples
 Caves in India
 Rock-cut temples in India
 Indian rock-cut architecture
 Chyavana Rishi
 Indus Valley Civilisation sites
 Highest point of Indian states and territories
 List of mountains in India
 Haryana Tourism

References 

Mountains of Rajasthan
Hills of Haryana
Hindu pilgrimage sites in India
Archaeological sites in Rajasthan
Aravalli Range
Mahendragarh district
Jhunjhunu district
Forts in Haryana
Archaeological sites in Haryana
Tourist attractions in Haryana
Rebuilt buildings and structures in India
Volcanoes of India
Tourist attractions in Jhunjhunu district
Hills of Rajasthan
Mountains of Haryana